The Tuareg people are nomads of the Sahara.

Tuareg may also refer to:
 Tuareg languages
 Tuareg rebellion (disambiguation)
 Tuareg Shield, an area lying between the West African craton and the Saharan Metacraton in West Africa
 Tuareg Sloughi, an African dog breed
 Touareg tea, a kind of flavoured tea prepared in northern Africa and in Arabian countries
 Tuareg – The Desert Warrior, a 1984 adventure film starring Mark Harmon
 Volkswagen Touareg, the second sport-utility vehicle manufactured by Volkswagen
 Tuareg (novel), a 1980 novel by Alberto Vázquez-Figueroa